The third season of the American television series MacGyver, consisting of 20 episodes, began on September 21, 1987, and ended on May 4, 1988, and aired on the ABC network. The region 1 DVD was released on September 6, 2005. According to IMDb, it is current available on Amazon's Paramount+ channel.

Episodes

References

External links 
 
 

1987 American television seasons
1988 American television seasons
MacGyver (1985 TV series) seasons